
Gmina Rymanów is an urban-rural gmina (administrative district) in Krosno County, Subcarpathian Voivodeship, in south-eastern Poland.

Villages
Apart from the town of Rymanów, Gmina Rymanów contains the villages and settlements of Bałucianka, Bzianka, Głębokie, Klimkówka, Królik Polski, Ladzin, Łazy, Milcza, Posada Górna, Puławy, Rudawka Rymanowska, Rymanów-Zdrój, Sieniawa, Wisłoczek, Wróblik Królewski, Wróblik Szlachecki and Zmysłówka.

Neighbouring gminas
Gmina Rymanów is bordered by the gminas of Besko, Bukowsko, Dukla, Haczów, Iwonicz-Zdrój, Jaśliska, Komańcza, Miejsce Piastowe and Zarszyn.

References
Polish official population figures 2006

Rymanow
Krosno County